Bhatkal is a coastal town in the Uttara Kannada District of the Indian state of Karnataka. Bhatkal lies on National Highway 66, which runs between Mumbai and Kanyakumari, and has Bhatkal railway station which is one of the major railway stations along the Konkan Railway line, which runs between Mumbai and Mangalore.

History
In its early days, Bhatkal was a part of tulunadu region and mainly inhabited by the followers of Jain and Hindu religions, but gradually people from other religions and cultures began to settle there. Bhatkal was named after Jain Grammarian, Bhattakalanka, who hailed from Hadwalli village, a town on the state highway toward Jog Falls, Shimoga. With Sharavathi river flowing a few miles to the north, the town is located along the shores of the Arabian Sea. Because of its strategic location, Bhatkal was the main factor behind the erratic history of the countryside. Bhatkal witnessed the rise and fall of several dynasties and rulers. It was a part of the Hoysala Empire, from 1291 to 1343, before falling into the hands of the Vijayanagara Empire. After the disintegration of the latter, the much-coveted town of Bhatkal came under the control of the Saluva (Jain) rulers based in Hadwalli.

Numerous temples and bases were constructed during the reign of the Saluva dynasty. Vestiges of this period can be found in Mudbhatkal, where a few temples are still standing as a testament to the magnificence of that era. The Nawayaths arrived on the West Coast of India from countries including Iraq, Iran, Yemen, Jordan, Saudi Arabia, Oman, Algeria, Egypt, Morocco, as traders of spices, leather, jewelry and Arabian horses. They chose to settle there and married into another trading community of India, the Jains, who had been converted to Islam. This led to the emergence of a new community.

Chola emperors under Aditya I, his son, Parantaka I, and Sundara Chola, also known as Parantaka Chola II, initially invaded and conquered territories in Kannada country, between Gangavadi on the Mysuru plateau and Bhatkal on the Sahyadri Coast, between 880 CE and 975 CE. They later built the Solesvara Temple to commemorate their victory over the region.

The Portuguese marked their presence in Bhatkal in the beginning of the 16th century. Krishnadevaraya, emperor of the Vijayanagara Empire, allowed them to build a fort in the town in 1510.  From the Keladi rulers, Bhatkal passed on to Hyder Ali and Tipu Sultan. Hyder Ali made Bhatkal the main base on the Canara Coast for his newly built Naval Force. Tipu Sultan made Bhatkal an important port and built a Mosque and a street named after him. One of Tipu's wives was from Bhatkal. Bhatkal later came into the hands of the British Empire in 1799 after they defeated Tipu.

Culture
The residents celebrate festivals such as 
Eid ul Fitr, Ramadan, Eid al azha, Muharram, Milad un nabi, Makara Sankranti, Nagara Panchami, Krishna Janmashtami, Ganesh Chaturthi, Navaratri, Deepavali. Folk arts like Yakshagana are also popular. Unlike other states, Nawayathi men wear lungis, which are stitched in the middle and are cylindrical in shape.

Cuisine
Bhatkali Cuisine is the blend with Arabian and konkan cuisine. Bhatkali biryani  is an integral part of the Nawayath cuisine and a specialty of Bhatkal, prepared with basmati rice that has been spiced with full garam masala and saffron. Separately, Delicious pieces of mutton, chicken, fish, or prawns are cooked. Some people even refer to it as a layered korma and rice meal with fried onions, curry, or mint leaves on top. Other type of biryani is Shayya Biryani made from vermicelli (shayyo) instead of rice.
The cuisine which is used for breakfast are Theek and goad thari (sweet and spicy semolina), gavan or thalla shayyo (wheat or rice vermicelli), a variety of appos (pancakes), fau (poha), theek and goad khubus (sweet and spicy bread), masala poli (heavy spiced paratha), gavan poli (wheat paratha) and puttu (steamed cakes).

Transport
Bhatkal is connected to other cities and states in India by roads and railways. The National Highway 66 (India) crosses the town, which had a major impact on its development. Under the Konkan Railway, many trains run day and night to and from the town. The Bhatkal railway station has two platforms. The nearest airports to Bhatkal are Mangalore International Airport and Goa-Dabolim International Airport. The town has one large, one medium, and one small fishing port.

Demographics

As per the 2011 India census, Bhatkal Taluk had a population of approximately 161,576 out of which, 49.98% were males and 50.02% were females. Bhatkal has an average literacy rate of 74.04%, with 78.72% and 69.36% of male and female literacy, respectively. Around 11% of the town's total population is under age 5. Scheduled Castes constitute 8.87% and Scheduled Tribes constitute 5.67% of the total population.

Governance
Bhatkal is a State Assembly constituency in Uttara Kannada district and the coastal Karnataka region of Karnataka. It is a part of the Uttara Kannada Parliamentary constituency. Sunil Naik, of the BJP, is the incumbent MLA.

Notable people
Ilyas Nadwi Bhatkali, Indian Islamic scholar, founder of Moulana Abul Hasan Ali Nadvi Academy, Bhatkal and its Quran Museum
Iqbal Bhatkal or Iqbal Shahbandri (born 1970), leader of the Indian Mujahideen
Mohammed Abdul Aleem Qasmi, Indian newspaper editor of Naqsh-e-Nawayath, the only newspaper in Nawyathi
Rajoo Bhatkal (born 1985), Indian cricketer, captain of Malnad Gladiators
Riyaz Bhatkal or Riyaz Ismail Shahbandri (born 1978), co-founder of the Indian Mujahideen, brother of Iqbal Bhatkal
Satyajit Bhatkal, Indian director of film and television
Shamshuddin Jukaku, Indian politician, first minister from Bhatkal in the Government of Mysore State, deputy chief minister in the 1950s
SM Syed Khaleel, Indian community leader, founder of institutions such as Jamia Islamia Bhatkal, awarded the Karnataka Rajya Utsav Award
Yasin Bhatkal or Mohammed Ahmed Siddibappa (born 1983), co-founder of the Indian Mujahideen
Zubair Kazi, Indian-American businessman, second-largest KFC franchisee

See also 
 Jamia Islamia Bhatkal
 Bhatkal and Sen
 Venkatapur, Bhatkal, Karnataka
 Nawayath
 Murdeshwar

References

External links
 Bhatkal, Town Municipal Council
 
 
 This is Bhatkal, where commerce & religion play chicken. 19 May 2018. Newslaundry.
 

Cities and towns in Uttara Kannada district